The Favor is a 1994 American romantic comedy film directed by Donald Petrie and written by Sara Parriott and Josann McGibbon. It stars Harley Jane Kozak, Elizabeth McGovern, Bill Pullman, Brad Pitt and Ken Wahl. The original music score was composed by Thomas Newman.

Plot
Kathy has seemingly been happily married to Peter, but their relationship has grown routine. She cannot help but wonder what would happen if she ever got together with her high school sweetheart, Tom, whom she had never slept with. 

Being married prevents Kathy from finding out what happened to Tom, so she asks her single, permiscuous, commitment-phobic friend Emily to do it for her. She asks her to look him up when she goes to Denver, sleep with him, then tell Kathy what it was like. 

Emily does this, but when she tells Kathy that Tom is awesome and they had sex all night, their friendship suffers, as does Kathy's marriage. Kathy becomes even more distracted, and regularly tries to seduce oblivious Peter. 

At the opening of Elliot, Emily's young lover, the women again talk about Tom. Emily  storms off, leaving Kathy to comfort him, which Peter observes. 

Things become even more complicated when Emily learns she is pregnant, and says she is uncertain if Tom or her 'boyfriend' Elliot is the father. Kathy tells Elliot about the pregnancy, simultaneously a work colleague of Peter's convinces him she may be cheating. Secretly following her, it seems like she's having an affair with Elliot.

Elliot has a show in Denver, and Kathy ends up on the same flight. She tells him the baby is actually Tom's, so she's going to find out if they still have a spark. As her room in the Hyatt isn't ready yet, she leaves her bag with Elliot to look for Tom.

As Tom has just finished a fishing competition, they go to his cabin so he can shower. In the meantime, Peter shows up at the hotel, hitting Elliot before he can explain. He then heads to get his wife Kathy, Emily soon follows. Her taxi beats Peter's, so she can warn Kathy. In the end both women and all three men are at the cabin, the two couples reconciling and Tom showing he's not relationship or father material. Kathy helps Emily plan her wedding with Elliot.

Cast
Harley Jane Kozak as Kathy Whiting
Elizabeth McGovern as Emily Embry
Bill Pullman as Peter Whiting
Brad Pitt as Elliot Fowler
Ken Wahl as Tom Andrews
Ginger Orsi as Gina
Leigh Ann Orsi as Hannah
Larry Miller as Joe Dubin
Gary Powell as Fishermen

Release
The Favor was filmed in 1990, but went into wide release in the United States and Canada on April 29, 1994, owing to Orion's bankruptcy in 1991. It was released to home video on the DVD format for Region 1 on December 29, 2001, through MGM Home Entertainment.

Reception
The film received mixed to negative reviews from critics. On the film-critics aggregate site Rotten Tomatoes, it received a 27% approval rating based on 11 reviews, with an average rating of 4.9/10. On Metacritic, the film has a 51 out of 100 based on 11 reviews, indicating “mixed or average reviews.” Audiences polled by CinemaScore gave the film an average grade of "B-" on an A+ to F scale.

Year-end lists
 Honorable mention – Michael MacCambridge, Austin American-Statesman

References

External links
 
 
 

1994 films
1994 romantic comedy films
American romantic comedy films
1990s English-language films
Orion Pictures films
Films directed by Donald Petrie
Films scored by Thomas Newman
Films shot in Portland, Oregon
1990s American films